Termessa xanthomelas is a moth in the subfamily Arctiinae. It was described by Oswald Bertram Lower in 1892. It is found in Australia, where it has been recorded from the Australian Capital Territory, New South Wales, Queensland, South Australia and Victoria.

References

Moths described in 1892
Lithosiini